Nuh is a town and administrative headquarter of the Nuh Sub-Division and Nuh district in the Indian state of Haryana.

History 

According to Mahabharata (900 BCE), the area was gifted by the eldest Pandava king Yudhishthira to their teacher Dronacharya. The city passed from the hands of the Maurya empire to invaders such as Parthian and Kushan, and later Yaudheya, after they expelled the Kushanas from the area between Yamuna and Satluj. Yodheyas were then subjugated by King Rudradaman I of Indo-Scythians and later by the Gupta Empire and then by the Hunas. The area was later ruled by Harsha (590 - 467 CE), Gurjara-Pratihara (mid 7th century CE to 11th century). The Tomara dynasty, who founded Dhillika in 736 CE, were earlier tributaries of Partiharas, overthrew Partiharas. In 1156 CE, it was conquered by king Visaladeva Chauhan of the Chauhan Dynasty. After the defeat of Prithviraj Chauhan in 1192 CE, the area came under Qutb al-Din Aibak (1206 CE) of the Delhi Sultanate who defeated and killed Prithviraj's son Hemraj, who had invaded Mewat from Alwar. The Meo, who were all Hindus at that point, killed Sayyid Wajih-ud-din who was sent to subjugate Meos, but they were later suppressed by Miran Hussain Jang, the nephew of Aibak, and the Meo who remained Hindus were forced to pay Islamic religious tax to Jizya. Others were forced to convert to Islam. In 1249 CE, Balban (Sultan of the Delhi Sultanate) killed 2,000 rebellious Meos. Meo rebels took away a large number of camels of Balban's army in 1257-58 CE. In 1260 CE, Balban retaliated by overrunning the area, killing 250 Meo prisoners, and slaughtering 12,000 women, children, and surviving men.

Khanzada Rajput Era 

At the time of the invasion of Timur in 1398 CE, Bahadur Nahar, formerly known as Sonpar Pal, of the Hindu Jadu clan was the prominent king of the area, who constructed the Kotla Bahadur Nahar fort near Kotla lake at Kotla village of Nuh. Sonpar Pal converted to Islam in 1355 and was given a new name of Raja Nahar Khan (not to be confused with Jat king Nahar Singh) by Sultan Firuz Shah Tughlaq. He became the founder of Khanzada Rajputs. After the fall of Tughlaq dynasty in 1398, Nahar Khan reconciled with Timur. In 1420, during the era of Nahar Khan's grandson, Khanzada Feroz Khan, Mewat was attacked by Sultan Khizr Khan of Delhi Sayyid dynasty. The Mewati army fortified themselves for one year in Kotla Fort, after which the Delhi army retreated. In 1425, great-grandsons of Bahadur Nahar named Khanzada Jalal Khan and Khanzada Abdul Qadir Khan (Jallu and Qaddu) revolted against Delhi Sultanate but were defeated by Delhi Sultan Mubarak Shah ( 1421– 1434 CE) who overran Mewat and killed Qaddu. Jallu continued the native Mewati rebellion against the Delhi sultanate, in 1427, the Mewati army fortified themselves for one year in the hills of Tijara, after which the Delhi army retreated. In 1527, Hasan Khan Mewati, a descendant of Raja Nahar Khan, sided with the Rajput king Rana Sanga and they were defeated by Babur at Battle of Khanwa where Hassan Khan Mewati was killed by the Mughals and his son Naher Khan II ruled Mewat as a vassal of the Mughals.

Mughal Era 
Aurangzeb sent Jai Singh I to crush the revolting Khanzada chief Ikram Khan, jagir of Tijara a descendant of Raja Nahar Khan (through his son Malik Alaudin Khan). After the death of Aurangzeb, Bahadurgarh and Farrukhnagar in the north were under the Baloch nawab who were granted jagir in 1713 CE by Mughal king Farrukhsiyar; the central area of Badshapur was under Hindu Badgurjar king Hathi Singh and the south including Nuh were under the great Jat king of Bharatpur State, Maharaja Suraj Mal. During the Maratha Empire the area was conquered by French generals in late 18th century and they granted Farukhnagar to George Thomas and Jharsa (Badshahpur) to Begum Sumro; the south area including Nuh remained under the Bharatpur Jat Kings and their vassal relatives, one of whom was Nahar Singh.

Geography 
It has an average elevation of 199 metres (652 feet).

It is 70 km from New Delhi. It is located in the far southwest area of Haryana.

Climate 
The climate in Nuh is varied. The low temperature can reach 0 degrees Celsius, while the high temperature can go up to 45 degrees Celsius.

Demographics 

As of the 2001 India census, Nuh had a population of 11,038. Males constitute 45% of the population and females 47%. Nuh has an average literacy rate of 54%, lower than the national average of 59.5%: male literacy is 63%, and female literacy is 44%. In Nuh, 20% of the population is under 6 years of age.

Visitor attractions and monuments 
The town assumed importance at the time of Bahadur Singh of Ghasera because of the trade in salt manufactured in neighbouring villages. To the west of the town is a masonry tank of red sandstone featuring a chhatri adorned with floral designs.

In 2018, five monuments were noted as state-protected monuments, including Ghasera fort, Chuhi Mal Ka Taalab, Old tehsil building in Nuh, Kotla mosque, and a group of monuments at Meoli. Various ancient monuments of historical importance are scattered in this region, including:

Ghasera Fort 

The ruined Ghasera Fort, a state protected monument, lies at Ghasera village  from Nuh city on Nun-Sohna road. that was ruled by Bahadur Singh Bargujar, a Rajput chief of 11 villages, he was killed in 1753 by the famous Jat king Surajmal of Bharatpur State after Jats besieged and ran over the Ghasera fort, after which Jats turned to Delhi by defeating Mughal king Ahmad Shah Bahadur and occupied the Red Fort there in 1754 CE.

Nalhshwar Mahadev temple and Pandava Reservoir 
It can be reached by the Nalhar road from Nuh city through a large ceremonial Hindu religious gate short distance from the temple. There is also a natural reservoir at base of Kadamb tree higher up in the Nalhar hill, which can be reached by climbing 250 paved and iron stairsteps behind the Nalhar Shiva Temple. According to the popular oral tradition, Pandavas stayed here, prayed to the lord Shiva and drank water from this reservoir during a visit in their 14 years long exile. Shaheed Hasan Khan Mewati Government Medical College is located nearby. View from the top of Nalhar hill is the best.

Swami Gyan Giri found the temple in ruins. He restored it with the help of the local villagers and installed a natural lingam here which has the images of Aum, Shiva, Ganesha, Ganges, Janau and Naga. The temple is now managed by the Shri Shiv Rudra Jan Kalyan Sanstha headquartered in Mojowal near Nangal Dam. A large fair and bhandara (langar) is held on Maha Shivaratri.

Kotla Fort, Kotla mosque and tomb of Bahadur Khan Nahar 
Square-shaped Kotla mosque (dating back to 1392-1400 CE) on a plinth, with grey quartzite tomb and red carved sandstone jalis has inscription on the ruined gateway, was notified as a state protected monument in June 2018.

Nuh System of Lakes 

Through a system of bunds and artificial drains the lakes of Khalilpur, Chandaini, and Kotla Dahar are drained by November to make the land available for cultivation.

In 2018, the Haryana government released INR82 crore (820 million) to rejuvenate Kotla Lake and other lakes in the Nuh system of lakes, which will recharge the ground water and irrigate 27,000 acres of farm land.

Transport 

Nuh is well connected to Gurgaon, Delhi, Rajasthan and Uttar Pradesh by high frequency bus service. Night bus services are also provided by Rajasthan and Haryana Roadways. It has a depot and workshop of Haryana Roadways. Frequent bus service provided by Haryana and Rajasthan Roadways from Delhi to Alwar serves Nuh city.

The nearest railway stations are Palwal (32 km) and Gurgaon (45 km). A new railway line is being laid from Alwar to Pirthala and Asaoti near Palwal as a part of Western Dedicated Freight Corridor. A small portion of the track will pass slightly east of Nuh town and a Nuh railway station may be created. Western Periphery Expressway for Manesar or Palwal is about 14 km from Nuh on NH 248A.

The nearest airport is Palam airport in New Delhi.

Education

Schools 

A.M.U. PUBLIC SR. SEC. SCHOOL BICHHORE (PUNHANA)
Sardar Gurumukh Singh Memorial School
Hindu Senior Secondary School
Meo High School
Utopian Sr. Sec. School (Punahana)
Maria Manzil Farzy and Nakli School
St.Michael School (Without Àffiliation)
Green Field Public School
Girl High School
Kasturba Gandhi Balika Vidhliya
Aravali Public School
A.M.U. EDUCATIONAL COLLEGE BICHHORE (NUH)
Modern Mother's Pride School

Higher Education 
Mewat Engineering college Palla NUH (WAKF)

Shaheed Hasan Khan Mewati Government Medical College (SHKM GMC) Nalhar, Nuh (Mewat) Haryana Govt.
shkmgmcnuh
Yasin Meo Degree College Nuh

Nearby cities and towns 

 Sohna (20 km) north
 Taoru (11 km) west
 Palwal (35 km) east
 Pinangwan (28 km) south east
 Punahana (41 km) south east
 Gurgaon (45 km) north
 Ferozepur Jhirka (37 km) south
 Faridabad (57 km) north east
 Delhi (75 km) north east
 Hodal (40 km) south east
 Narnaul (106 km) west
 Rewari (52 km) west
 Tijara (45 km) south west
 Hathin ( 25 km) east
 Tapukara ( 26 km) west

References

External links
Photos of Nuh
Photo trip of Nalhar Reservoir and Shiva Temple
Photo trip of Shaking Minarets of Tomb of Sheikh Musa
Photo trip of Chui Mal ka talaab

Cities and towns in Nuh district